Pobrđe may refer to:
 Pobrđe (Bratunac), Bosnia and Herzegovina
 Pobrđe, Kotor, Montenegro
 Pobrđe (Novi Pazar), Serbia
 Pobrđe (Raška), Serbia